Matti Breschel (born 31 August 1984) is a Danish retired professional road racing cyclist, who competed between 2005 and 2019 for the , ,  and  teams.

Career

Junior career
Born in Ballerup, Breschel got his breakthrough with small Danish Team PH, finishing 6th at the U/23 Cycling World Championship in Verona in 2004 where he helped fellow Dane Mads Christensen finish 3rd. He also won the bronze medal at the Danish National Road Racing Championship during the summer of 2004.

Team CSC (2005–2010)

2005 
He turned professional for the 2005 season in Denmark based , where he signed a two-year contract. At the press conference, regarding his choice to join Team CSC in October 2004, he stated that he simply wished to adjust to the rigors of professional cycling, saying "I hope to get in the team, but in the beginning I just want to learn the game and to learn the races. Somewhere I know that I'm in for a beating." Under tutelage of seasoned veteran Lars Michaelsen, Breschel would start the season in the Tour of Qatar, where the two riders finished side by side, Breschel conceding the final victory to Michaelsen. They would ride a number of classics and smaller races together, and Breschel finished in a number of secondary placings, just missing the victory podiums.

2006 
For the start of the 2006 season, he once again showed himself in Tour of Qatar, finishing as the best young rider of the race for the second year in a row. He showed his good form in March with a third-place finish in Le Samyn, being beaten only by Philippe Gilbert in the bunch sprint of the peloton, and a few days later he sprinted his way to second place at stage 2 of the Driedaagse van West-Vlaanderen where he was second only to world class sprinter Robbie McEwen. For the third, and last, stage of the race, Breschel would once more sprint against McEwen, with the winner taking the overall victory of the race, this time with the effect that both riders crashed. Breschel broke his vertebrae in two places and McEwen was de-classed in the race.

2007 
He came back with thunder and lightning in 2007 and came in an impressive 14th at the Paris–Roubaix, which his team-mate Stuart O'Grady won.
After recovering he won his first victory as a professional in stage 2 of Danmark Rundt in August 2007. This was the first Danish stage win in five years of this national tour.

2008 
In 2008 his best season came and he got his first big international breakthrough when he on 8 June 2008, won the Philadelphia International Championship also known as the Commerce Bank International Championship in Philadelphia, PA where he outsprinted all contenders in a little bunch sprint after a long and hard race. A couple of weeks later he went on to take another impressive victory when he won the 2nd stage of Ster Elektrotoer, a stage finishing on the feared Cauberg and also won the overall points jersey. He maintained his good form through the season and also came in 2nd in the Danish Road Racing Championship, only beaten by his teammate Nicki Sørensen.
In August he won two stages at Tour of Denmark and also led the overall classification until the final time trial securing him a total fifth place.

After all a very impressive season for the young gun the biggest scalp came on 21 September where he won the last stage of the Vuelta a España in Madrid in a very convincing way only a few days after he came in second in the 17th stage of the Vuelta a España. Only a week later Breschel rode very impressively at the world cycling championships finishing 3rd and getting a bronze medal.

2009 
Breschel had his best cobbled classics campaign ever in 2009. He managed to finish 6th at the Tour of Flanders and 9th at the Paris-Roubaix. In June he became the Danish National Road Race Champion, and he also won stages in the Tour de Suisse, Volta a Catalunya, Tour de Luxembourg and Post Danmark Rundt. He managed to finish 2nd at the Vattenfall Cyclassics.

2010 
During the 2010 season Breschel rode well in the Cobbled Classics but suffered from bad luck. Breschel won Dwars door Vlaanderen and put in strong performances in Gent–Wevelgem and Ronde Vlaanderen, but suffered mechanical defects in both races.

Rabobank (2011–2012) 
In the 2012 Paris–Roubaix he was troubled by a knee injury. However a week before that, he had finished 9th at the Tour of Flanders. He was also on the podium at the Gent-Wevelgem.

Breschel left  at the end of the 2012 season, and joined the Danish team  on a two-year contract from the 2013 season onwards.

Saxo-Tinkoff (2013–2015) 
In his return to the former Team CSC squad, Breschel managed to pick up four stage wins at the Danmark Rundt – two each in 2013 and 2015. He also won 2 stages and the overall at the Tour de Luxembourg.

Cannondale (2016) 
He rode the Tour de France but abandoned the race on stage 14 after crashing. His best results in the season were, 5th at the GP du canton d'Argovie and 6th at Heistse Pijl.

Astana (2017) 
Breschel did not have the best year at Astana, and his best result was 12th at Dwaars door Vlaanderen, a race he had previously won in 2010.

EF Education First–Drapac (2018–2019) 
Breschel returned to the  team after a year in  colors. He finished 9th on a wet stage 5 in the Paris-Nice. At the Milan-San Remo, Breschel sprinted home in 12th position.

He announced his retirement on 18 August 2019, effective from the end of the season, due to psoriatic arthritis.

Major results

2001
 National Junior Road Championships
1st  Road race
3rd Time trial
2003
 6th Fyen Rundt
2004
 1st Giro del Canavese
 1st Stage 3 Circuit des Ardennes
 1st Stage 2 Ringerike GP
 3rd Road race, National Road Championships
 6th Road race, UCI Under-23 Road World Championships
 6th Paris–Roubaix Espoirs
 10th Overall Le Triptyque des Monts et Châteaux
2005
 2nd Overall Tour of Qatar
1st  Young rider classification
 3rd Road race, National Road Championships
 4th GP Herning
 4th Paris–Bourges
 4th Grand Prix d'Isbergues
 5th Overall Circuit Franco-Belge
2006
 3rd Overall Driedaagse van West-Vlaanderen
1st  Young rider classification
 3rd Le Samyn
 6th Overall Tour of Qatar
1st  Young rider classification
 7th Reading Classic
2007
 Tour of Ireland
1st  Points classification
1st Stage 2
 3rd Overall Danmark Rundt
1st Stage 2
 3rd GP Herning
 4th Overall Ster Elektrotoer
 7th Paris–Bourges
 9th Overall Sachsen Tour
2008
 1st Philadelphia International Championship
 1st Stage 21 Vuelta a España
 2nd Road race, National Road Championships
 3rd  Road race, UCI Road World Championships
 5th Overall Danmark Rundt
1st  Points classification
1st Stages 2 & 3
 5th Overall Ster Elektrotoer
1st Stage 2
 6th Trofeo Laigueglia
 7th E3 Prijs Vlaanderen
 8th Paris–Bourges
2009
 1st  Road race, National Road Championships
 1st Stage 4 Tour de Suisse
 1st Stage 2 Volta a Catalunya
 2nd Vattenfall Cyclassics
 3rd Overall Tour of Ireland
1st  Young rider classification
 4th Overall Tour de Luxembourg
1st  Points classification
1st Stage 4
 5th Overall Danmark Rundt
1st  Points classification
1st Stage 1
 6th Tour of Flanders
 7th Road race, UCI Road World Championships
 10th Paris–Roubaix
2010
 1st Dwars door Vlaanderen
 2nd  Road race, UCI Road World Championships
 2nd Gran Piemonte
 3rd Paris–Bourges
 5th Overall Danmark Rundt
1st  Points classification
1st Stage 3
 8th Gent–Wevelgem
2012
 1st Stage 3 Vuelta a Burgos
 3rd Gent–Wevelgem
 7th Trofeo Palma de Mallorca
 9th Tour of Flanders
2013
 3rd Overall Danmark Rundt
1st Stages 2 & 3
 4th Road race, National Road Championships
 8th Grand Prix Cycliste de Québec
 9th Vattenfall Cyclassics
2014
 1st  Overall Tour de Luxembourg
1st  Points classification
1st Stages 2 & 3
 4th Road race, UCI Road World Championships
 5th Overall Tour de l'Eurométropole
 9th Paris–Bourges
2015
 6th E3 Harelbeke
 7th Vattenfall Cyclassics
 8th Overall Danmark Rundt
1st  Points classification
1st Stages 3 & 4
 10th Overall Tour de Wallonie
2016
 5th Grand Prix of Aargau Canton
 6th Heistse Pijl
2018
 3rd Japan Cup

Grand Tour general classification results timeline

Classics & Monuments results timeline

Major championships timeline

Footnotes

External links

 Team Saxo Bank profile
 
 Matti Breschel's profile on Cycling Base

1984 births
Living people
People from Ballerup
Danish male cyclists
Danish Vuelta a España stage winners
Tour de Suisse stage winners
Cyclists at the 2012 Summer Olympics
Olympic cyclists of Denmark
Sportspeople from the Capital Region of Denmark